Bristol is a suburban city located in Hartford County, Connecticut, United States,  southwest-west of Hartford. The city is also 120 miles southwest from Boston, and approximately 100 miles northeast of New York City.  As of the 2020 census, the population of the city was 60,833.

Bristol is the location of the general studios of ESPN, and the location of Lake Compounce, the United States's oldest continuously operating theme park. Bristol was known as a clock-making city in the 19th century, and is the location of American Clock & Watch Museum. Bristol is the site of the former American Silver Company and its predecessor companies.

Bristol's nickname is the "Mum City", because it was once a leader in chrysanthemum production and still holds an annual Bristol Mum Festival.

History

The area that includes present-day Bristol was originally inhabited by the Tunxis Native American tribe, one of the Eastern Algonquian-speaking peoples that shared the lower Connecticut River Valley.

Originally, Bristol was within the boundaries of Farmington, Connecticut, which was incorporated in 1645. This deed was confirmed by another deed in 1650. The first actual settler of Bristol was Daniel Brownson, who built a house near West Street, but did not stay in the area very long. The first permanent settler was Ebenezer Barnes, who the next year built a home on King Street. Also in 1728, Nehemiah Manross arrived from Lebanon, and built a house north of Barnes Street, on the west side of King Street. The following year the first settlement arrived in what is now known as East Bristol when Nathaniel Messenger of Hartford and Benjamin Buck of Southington bought land and built houses along King Street.

Other houses were soon built around present-day Bristol wherever land was available for farming. This included the slope of Fall Mountain, now called Wolcott Street, and on Chippens Hill. By 1742, the families inhabiting the area petitioned the Connecticut Colony General Court for permission to create their own Congregational Society, citing the difficulties traveling to Farmington during winter. The Court approved their petition for the winter months only, and in 1744, agreed that area residents could set up through own ecclesiastical society. It was called New Cambridge. With their own congregation, area settlers began forming their own local government. However, since homes were so widely scattered, the General Court formed a committee to locate the geographic center of the settlement. The area now known as Federal Hill was deemed the center, and the first Congregationalist church was   built there.

In 1785, New Cambridge was incorporated as the town of Bristol, named after Bristol, England. By 1790, the industry for which the town later became famous was established by the pioneer of clock making Gideon Roberts. Roberts began making wooden moment clocks and peddled them by horseback through Connecticut, New York and Pennsylvania. As Roberts' sons grew up and began helping with the business, Gideon increased production and Bristol clocks were soon sold all over the country. By the early 19th century, nearly all of the capital and skill in town was involved in the clock industry in some form or fashion. The clock business gave way to related industries, which included brass, springs, bearings, and hardware. As Bristol began to grow, many ethnic groups arrived to work in the industries.

It was incorporated as a city in 1911. Today, Bristol is mostly residential and best known as the home of ESPN (which arrived in 1979), the American Clock & Watch Museum (since 1952), and Lake Compounce, America’s oldest operating theme park—opened in 1846.

Blight Committee

In the 1990s, the Blight Committee was formed to enforce appearance laws, and even demolish properties which it deems are unsightly and unkempt.  This committee is tasked with ensuring that properties are not abandoned and that all properties are reasonably maintained.

In 2008, the Bristol Blight Committee was disbanded in order to make way for a new committee, the Bristol Code Enforcement Committee.  This new committee has even greater powers and can now deal with both appearances and structural integrity issues of buildings in Bristol.  The purpose of the committee is to streamline the process of enforcing the issues the former Blight Committee was tasked with.  The law requires all structures to be free of "abandoned vehicles, nuisances, refuse, pollution and filth ... broken glass, loose shingles, holes, cracked or damaged siding, crumbling brick and other conditions 'reflective of deterioration or inadequate maintenance.'"

Downtown revitalization

Since 2008, Bristol has begun another renovation of the downtown area.  The Bristol Downtown Development Corporation was formed to manage the downtown renovation.  This has included a complete overhaul of a park in the center of the city.  In addition, the outdated and underused Bristol Centre Mall from the mid-1960s was purchased by the city, then demolished in 2008, yielding a 17-acre site suitable for development, christened Depot Square by the city.  Also, North Main Street was improved in 2008 by adding islands in the road, elegant street lighting and a brick median when the road was repaved.

Geography
Bristol contains several distinct sections, including Cedar Lake in the southwestern quarter, Chippens Hill in the northwestern quarter, Edgewood in the northeastern quarter, Forestville in the southeastern quarter and the city in the approximate middle of Bristol. The majority of Bristol's area is residential in character, though since 2008 there has been a push for commercial development in the city. The city is part of the Naugatuck Valley Regional Planning Organization following the closure of the Central Connecticut Regional Planning Agency, the metropolitan planning organization for Bristol, New Britain, and surrounding towns for decades.

Forestville was the hunting grounds of the Tunxis tribe until the 19th century. The village was established in 1833 and named Forestville for its wooded surroundings. Forestville today has grown into a mini-metropolis of suburban neighborhoods and local businesses. The boundaries of Forestville go from the Plainville town line, south to the Southington town line, west up to the industrial development along Middle street and crosses King Street, including properties on Kingswood Drive and Bernside Drive, north up to Bristol Eastern High School, then north up to the south edge of properties on Louisiana Avenue, then to the west of properties on the west side of Brook Street and from there, goes up to commercial  development along Farmington Avenue. Within the Forestville area, there are two subsections known as East Bristol and the Stafford District. Forestville village has a library branch (Manross), post office, meeting hall, community group (Forestville Village Association), fire station, cemetery, funeral home, two urban parks (Quinlan Veterans Park and Clock Tower Park), Pequabuck Duck Race, Memorial Day Parade, Summer Concert Night, Pumpkin Festival, and a railroad station (no longer in use). At one time all of Forestville had its own zip code.

Demographics

As of the 2010 census, there were 60,477 people, 25,189 households, and 16,175 families residing in the city. The population density was 2,265.8 inhabitants per square mile (874.8/km2). The racial makeup of the city is 87.74% White, 3.84% African American, 9.64% Hispanic, 0.19% Native American, 1.94% Asian, 0.02% Pacific Islander, 3.72% from other races, and 2.54% from two or more races.

In 2000 there were 24,886 households in Bristol, of which 29.6% had children under the age of 18 living with them, 49.6% were married couples living together, 11.5% had a female householder with no husband present, and 35.0% were non-families. Of all households 28.9% were made up of individuals, and 10.7% consisted of a sole resident who was 65 years of age or older. The average household size was 2.38, and the average family size was 2.94.

The age diversity at the 2000 census was 23.2% under the age of 18, 7.2% from 18 to 24, 32.5% from 25 to 44, 22.2% from 45 to 64, and 14.9% who were 65 years of age or older. The median age was 38 years. For every 100 females, there were 93.6 males. For every 100 females age 18 and over, there were 90.6 males.

The median income for a household in the city in 2010 was $57,610. The per capita income for the city was $30,573. Of the population 10.5% was living below the poverty line. Out of the total population, 8.7% of those under the age of 18 and 5.9% of those 65 and older were living below the poverty line.

Economy

Notable companies
The companies below are some of the most notable in Bristol.  These, in addition to Bristol Hospital, are the largest private employers in the area.

Associated Spring
Founded in 1857 and headquartered in Bristol, Barnes Group is a diversified international manufacturer of precision metal components and assemblies and a distributor of industrial supplies, serving a wide range of markets and customers. Barnes Group consists of three businesses with 2005 sales of $1.1 billion.

ESPN
ESPN houses its broadcast studios in Bristol on Middle Street.  ESPN is the largest taxpayer to the City of Bristol.

ESPN's former parent, Capital Cities Communications, once owned the local ABC affiliate WTNH, but sold it after acquiring ABC (which owned ESPN), and later merged with The Walt Disney Company.

Otis Elevator company
Though its beginnings were in Yonkers, New York, Otis Elevator Company possesses the tallest elevator test tower in the United States in Bristol.  Located near ESPN and Lake Compounce, the -high tower is easily visible from the surrounding roads.

Top employers
According to Bristol's 2019 Comprehensive Annual Financial Report, the top employers in the city were:

Arts and culture
Bristol holds an annual street festival in September with a car show and a family farms weekend at Minors Farm, Shepherd Meadows and Roberts Orchard.

Mum Festival and parade
The first Bristol Mum Festival began on July 7, 1962, and included a parade. The members of the Chamber of Commerce and City of Bristol officials met and completed a list of activities to take place over six days. They wanted to focus on the positive things that were occurring in Bristol. When the festival opened it was originally known as the "Fall Festival". In 1963 the chrysanthemum ("Mum") was also added to the festival's name. Prior to 1986 the nurseries in Bristol would produce over 80,000 mum plants.  In 2014, city leaders elected to adopt a new "brand" for the city. "All Heart" became the new logo on letterheads and T-shirts and even the "Mum Festival" leaders were "encouraged" to adopt the new image at the festival and parade.

Other attractions
Located in Bristol are the American Clock & Watch Museum, Imagine Nation, A Museum Early Learning Center, Bristol Military Memorial Museum, Bristol Historical Society Museum, Witch's Dungeon Classic Movie Museum, and the Harry Barnes Memorial Nature Center which is part of the Environmental Learning Centers of Connecticut. There is also a Polish-American Dożynki festival every September, at St Stanislaus Church.

Sports
Bristol has a summer collegiate baseball team called the Bristol Blues who play home games at Muzzy Field.

Muzzy Field is one of the oldest ballparks in the United States. In 2012 and 2013, the City of Bristol approved funding for a significant renovation project of the historic ballpark.

Bristol hosts the Little League New England and Mid-Atlantic Regional playoffs every August at the A. Bartlett Giamatti Little League Center.

Parks and recreation
Parks in Bristol include Peck, Page, Rockwell, Bracket, Barnes Nature Center, Indian Rock, and Forestville Memorial. The city is also home to Lake Compounce (1846), the oldest continuously operated amusement park in North America, and to the New England Carousel Museum.

Government

The city is governed under a Mayor-council form of government. Both the mayor and councilpersons are elected every two years. The city's Treasurer, Board of Assessment Appeals, and Board of Education are also elected every two years. Jeff Caggiano (R) was elected as mayor on November 2, 2021. Ellen Zoppo-Sassu (D), first elected in the 2017 municipal election and was re-elected in 2019. The last municipal election was held on November 2, 2021.

The City Council is made up of six members, elected every two years from three two member districts. As of the 2021 municipal elections, the members of the city council are:
District 1: Republicans Sebastian Panioto and Jolene Lusitani
District 2: Republicans Jacqueline Olsen and Susan Tyler
District 3: Republicans Andrew Howe and Cheryl Thibeault

Bristol is represented in the Connecticut House of Representatives by state representatives Cara Pavalock D’Amato (R-77), Whit Betts (R-78), and Chris Ziogas (D-79). State Senator Henri Martin (R-31) represents Bristol in the Connecticut Senate. At the federal level, Bristol is in Connecticut's 1st congressional district and is currently represented by Democrat John B. Larson.

Education
Education in Bristol is conducted using seven elementary schools (grades kindergarten through five), two middle schools (grades six, seven and eight), and two high schools.  In addition to these public schools, there are three private Catholic Schools, and one  Lutheran School available.  These add an additional three pre-kindergarten through grade 8 schools and one additional high school.

A recent press release shows good scores on the Connecticut Academic Performance Test, a standardized test which students take statewide in tenth grade.  The report states that more than 87% of Bristol students scored at or above the proficient level in each of the content areas assessed.

Recently, it has been proposed that the educational system of the city be redesigned.  Because some of the schools are in historic buildings, new schools are being sought by the city.  In addition, it has been proposed that the entire education system of the city be redesigned, eliminating the middle school category.  In other words, all schools would be kindergarten through eighth grade or high school.  The Bristol Board of Education's appeals for support for this project have been met with mixed emotions.

Media
The local daily newspaper is The Bristol Press, and town news is also featured in a small weekly called the Bristol Observer.

Infrastructure

Transportation

Bus 
Bristol has a bus service that connects urban centers and hospitals with the rest of the city. It is part of the CTtransit system, which serves the Greater Hartford area.

Public safety

EMS
Bristol's emergency medical services program has been provided by Bristol Hospital since 1977.  It was designed to assume the responsibility previously carried by the Bristol Police Department.  The Bristol Hospital's EMS are carried out using 6 emergency ambulances (including spares), 2 paramedic intercept vehicles and 4 wheelchair vans.

Fire department
The Bristol, Connecticut Fire Department is a full-service fire department with five engine companies (or stations) and one tower ladder company.  The Bristol Board of Fire Commissioners consists of five members appointed by the Mayor who establish the primary policies of the fire department.

Police department
The Bristol Police Department is a full-service police department with approximately 125 sworn officers.  The Bristol Board of Police Commissioners consists of five members appointed by the Mayor who establish the primary policies of the police department. In addition to a vehicular patrol division, downtown Bristol is also policed by a bicycle division.  During any shift, there may be as many as 12 officers on duty, not including detectives and officers from other divisions.

Notable people
 Amos Bronson Alcott (1799–1888), father of Louisa May Alcott, taught school in Bristol on two different occasions: in 1823 and, after teaching in Cheshire for a time, again in Bristol from 1827–1828. Alcott later moved to Concord, Massachusetts where he became acquainted with many prominent Transcendentalists and literary figures
 John R. Broderick (born 1957), President of Old Dominion University in Norfolk, Virginia, was born in Bristol
 Gary Burghoff (born 1943), actor who played the character Corporal Walter "Radar" O'Reilly in both the film and television series M*A*S*H, was born in Bristol
 Bob Crane (1928–1978), actor who played the title role in the television series Hogan's Heroes, worked for WBIS radio station in Bristol early in his career
 Chris Denorfia, former Major League Baseball outfielder, was born in Bristol
 Frank Filipetti, music producer, was born in Bristol
 Michelle Guerette (born 1980), Olympic athlete, graduated from Bristol Central High School
 Aaron Hernandez (1989–2017), NFL former tight end for the New England Patriots and convicted murderer
 Gordon J. Humphrey (born 1940), U.S. Senator from New Hampshire (1979–1991) was born in Bristol
 Cliff Johnson, author of The Fool's Errand, was born in Bristol
 Karen Josephson (born 1964) and Sarah Josephson (born 1964), twin sisters who won the silver medal in synchronized swimming at the 1988 Summer Olympics in Seoul, South Korea and the gold medal at the 1992 Summer Olympics in Barcelona, Spain, were born in Bristol
 Jocelin Donahue (born 1981), actress most famous for her role in Ti West's critically acclaimed horror film The House of the Devil, born and raised in Bristol
 Fred Lynn, debuted in his professional baseball career playing for the Bristol Red Sox at Muzzy Field, an early twentieth-century ballpark in Bristol. Baseball Hall of Famer Jim Rice, who debuted with Williamsport in the New York-Penn League and then played for Winter Haven of the Florida State League, also played part of his minor league career for the Bristol Red Sox
 Scott Perkins (born 1980), American composer, was raised in Bristol and graduated from Bristol Central High School
 Steve Pikiell (born 1967), head basketball coach at Rutgers University; formerly coach at Stony Brook University
 Mike Reiss (born 1959), longtime writer for The Simpsons, is a Bristol native
 Albert Rockwell (1862–1925) inventor, manufacturer, industrialist, and philanthropist who moved to Bristol in the 1880s. He designed and manufactured doorbells and other kinds of bells (hence the name Bell City), bicycle brakes, ball bearings, and automobiles
 Adrian Wojnarowski, New York Times best-selling author and NBA Columnist for Yahoo! Sports, Fox Sports One, and now ESPN was raised in Bristol and attended Bristol Central High School

Sister cities
 Kozani, Greece

Gallery

References

External links

 City of Bristol official website
 City of Bristol official tourism website
 Bristol Historical Society

 
Cities in Connecticut
Cities in Hartford County, Connecticut
Greater Hartford